A galley is a type of ship that is propelled mainly by oars. The galley is characterized by its long, slender hull, shallow draft, and low freeboard (clearance between sea and gunwale). Virtually all types of galleys had sails that could be used in favorable winds, but human effort was always the primary method of propulsion. This allowed galleys to navigate independently of winds and currents. The galley originated among the seafaring civilizations around the Mediterranean Sea in the late second millennium BC and remained in use in various forms until the early 19th century in warfare, trade, and piracy.

Galleys were the warships used by the early Mediterranean naval powers, including the Greeks, Illyrians, Phoenicians, and Romans. They remained the dominant types of vessels used for war and piracy in the Mediterranean Sea until the last decades of the 16th century. As warships, galleys carried various types of weapons throughout their long existence, including rams, catapults, and cannons, but also relied on their large crews to overpower enemy vessels in boarding actions. They were the first ships to effectively use heavy cannons as anti-ship weapons. As highly efficient gun platforms, they forced changes in the design of medieval seaside fortresses as well as refinement of sailing warships.

Galleys were the most common warships in the Atlantic Ocean during the Middle Ages, and later saw limited use in the Caribbean, the Philippines, and the Indian Ocean in the early modern period, mostly as patrol craft to combat pirates. From the mid-16th century galleys were in intermittent use in the Baltic Sea, with its short distances and extensive archipelagoes. The zenith of galley usage in warfare came in the late 16th century with battles like that at Lepanto in 1571, one of the largest naval battles ever fought. By the 17th century, however, sailing ships and hybrid ships like the xebec displaced galleys in naval warfare. There was a minor revival of galley warfare in the 18th century in the wars among Russia, Sweden, and Denmark.

Definition and terminology
The term galley derives from the Medieval Greek galea, a smaller version of the dromon, the prime warship of the Byzantine navy. The origin of the Greek word is unclear but could possibly be related to galeos, the Greek word for dogfish shark. The word galley has been attested in English from c. 1300 and has been used in most European languages from around 1500 both as a general term for oared warships, and from the Middle Ages and onward more specifically for the Mediterranean-style vessel.
It was only from the 16th century that a unified galley concept came in use. Before that, particularly in antiquity, there was a wide variety of terms used for different types of galleys. In modern historical literature, galley is occasionally used as a general term for various types of oared vessels larger than boats, though the "true" galley is defined as the ships belonging to the Mediterranean tradition.

Ancient galleys were named according to the number of oars, the number of banks of oars or lines of rowers. The terms are based on contemporary language use combined with more recent compounds of Greek and Latin words. The earliest Greek single-banked galleys are called triaconters (from triakontoroi, "thirty-oars") and penteconters (pentēkontoroi, "fifty-oars"). For later galleys with more than one row of oars, the terminology is based on Latin numerals with the suffix -reme from rēmus, "oar". A monoreme has one bank of oars, a bireme two, and a trireme three. Since the maximum banks of oars was three, any expansion above that did not refer to additional banks of oars, but of additional rowers for every oar. Quinquereme (quintus + rēmus) was literally a "five-oar", but actually meant that there were several rowers to certain banks of oars which made up five lines of oar handlers. For simplicity, they have by many modern scholars been referred to as "fives", "sixes", "eights", "elevens", etc. Anything above six or seven rows of rowers was not common, though even a very exceptional "forty" is attested in contemporary source. Any galley with more than three or four lines of rowers is often referred to as a "polyreme".

Classicist Lionel Casson has applied the term "galley" to oared Viking ships of the Early and High Middle Ages, both their well known longship warships and their less familiar merchant galleys. Oared military vessels built on the British Isles in the 11th to 13th centuries were based on Scandinavian designs, but were nevertheless referred to as "galleys". Many of them were similar to birlinns (a smaller version of the Highland galley), close relatives of longship types like the snekkja. By the 14th century, they were replaced with balingers in southern Britain while longship-type Highland and Irish galleys and birlinns remained in use throughout the Middle Ages in northern Britain.

Medieval and early modern galleys used a different terminology from their ancient predecessors. Names were based on the changing designs that evolved after the ancient rowing schemes were forgotten. Among the most important is the Byzantine dromon, the predecessor to the Italian galea sottila. This was the first step toward the final form of the Mediterranean war galley. As galleys became an integral part of an advanced, early modern system of warfare and state administration, they were divided into a number of ranked grades based on the size of the vessel and the number of its crew. The most basic types were the following: large commander "lantern galleys", half-galleys, galiots, fustas, brigantines, and fregatas. Naval historian Jan Glete has described as a sort of predecessor of the later rating system of the Royal Navy and other sailing fleets in Northern Europe.

The French navy and the Royal Navy built a series of "galley frigates" from c. 1670–1690 that were small two-decked sailing cruisers with a set of oarports on the lower deck. The three British galley frigates also had distinctive names – James Galley, Charles Galley, and Mary Galley. In the late 18th century, the term "galley" was in some contexts used to describe minor oared gun-armed vessels which did not fit into the category of the classic Mediterranean type. In North America, during American Revolutionary War and other wars with France and Britain, the early US Navy and other navies built vessels that were called "galleys" or "row galleys", though they were actually brigantines or Baltic gunboats. This type of description was more a characterization of their military role, and was in part due to technicalities in administration and naval financing. In the latter part of the 19th century, the Royal Navy term for the gig (a ship's boat optimised for propulsion by oar) reserved for the captain's use was, very strictly, "galley" – even though it was issued to the ship by the navy dockyard as a gig.

History
Among the earliest known watercraft were canoes made from hollowed-out logs, the earliest ancestors of galleys. Their narrow hulls required them to be paddled in a fixed sitting position facing forward, a less efficient form of propulsion than rowing with proper oars, facing backward. Seagoing paddled craft have been attested by finds of terracotta sculptures and lead models in the region of the Aegean Sea from the 3rd millennium BC. However, archaeologists believe that the Stone Age colonization of islands in the Mediterranean around 8,000 BC required fairly large, seaworthy vessels that were paddled and possibly even equipped with sails. The first evidence of more complex craft that are considered to prototypes for later galleys comes from Ancient Egypt during the Old Kingdom (c. 2700–2200 BC). Under the rule of pharaoh Pepi I (2332–2283 BC) these vessels were used to transport troops to raid settlements along the Levantine coast and to ship back slaves and timber. During the reign of Hatshepsut (c. 1479–57 BC), Egyptian galleys traded in luxuries on the Red Sea with the enigmatic Land of Punt, as recorded on wall paintings at the Mortuary Temple of Hatshepsut at Deir el-Bahari.

Shipbuilders, probably Phoenician, a seafaring people who lived on the southern and eastern coasts of the Mediterranean, were the first to create the two-level galley that would be widely known under its Greek name, diērēs, or bireme. Even though the Phoenicians were among the most important naval civilizations in early classical antiquity, little detailed evidence have been found concerning the types of ships they used. The best depictions found so far have been small, highly stylized images on seals which depict crescent-shape vessels equipped with one mast and banks of oars. Colorful frescoes on the Minoan settlement on Santorini (c. 1600 BC) show more detailed pictures of vessels with ceremonial tents on deck in a procession. Some of these are rowed, but others are paddled with men laboriously bent over the railings. This has been interpreted as a possible ritual reenactment of more ancient types of vessels, alluding to a time before rowing was invented, but little is otherwise known about the use and design of Minoan ships.

In the earliest days of the galley, there was no clear distinction between ships of trade and war other than their actual usage. River boats plied the waterways of ancient Egypt during the Old Kingdom (2700–2200 BC) and seagoing galley-like vessels were recorded bringing back luxuries from across the Red Sea in the reign of pharaoh Hatshepsut. Fitting rams to the bows of vessels sometime around the 8th century BC resulted in a distinct split in the design of warships, and set trade vessels apart, at least when it came to use in naval warfare. The Phoenicians used galleys for transports that were less elongated, carried fewer oars and relied more on sails. Carthaginian galley wrecks found off Sicily that date to the 3rd or 2nd century BC had a length to breadth ratio of 6:1, proportions that fell between the 4:1 of sailing merchant ships and the 8:1 or 10:1 of war galleys. Merchant galleys in the ancient Mediterranean were intended as carriers of valuable cargo or perishable goods that needed to be moved as safely and quickly as possible.

The first Greek galleys appeared around the second half of the 2nd millennium BC. In the epic poem, the Iliad, set in the 12th century BC, galleys with a single row of oarsmen were used primarily to transport soldiers to and from various land battles. The first recorded naval battle, the Battle of the Delta between Egyptian forces under Ramesses III and the enigmatic alliance known as the Sea Peoples, occurred as early as 1175 BC. It is the first known engagement between organized armed forces, using sea vessels as weapons of war, though primarily as fighting platforms. It was distinguished by being fought against an anchored fleet close to shore with land-based archer support.

The first true Mediterranean galleys usually had between 15 and 25 pairs of oars and were called triaconters or penteconters, literally "thirty-" and "fifty-oared", respectively. Not long after they appeared, a third row of oars was added by the addition to a bireme of an outrigger, a projecting construction that gave more room for the projecting oars. These new galleys were called triērēs ("three-fitted") in Greek. The Romans later called this design the triremis, trireme, the name it is today best known under. It has been hypothesized that early types of triremes existed as early as 700 BC, but the earliest conclusive literary reference dates to 542 BC. With the development of triremes, penteconters disappeared altogether. Triaconters were still used, but only for scouting and express dispatches.

The first warships

The earliest use for galleys in warfare was to ferry fighters from one place to another, and until the middle of the 2nd millennium BC had no real distinction from merchant freighters. Around the 14th century BC, the first dedicated fighting ships were developed, sleeker and with cleaner lines than the bulkier merchants. They were used for raiding, capturing merchants and for dispatches. During this early period, raiding became the most important form of organized violence in the Mediterranean region. Maritime classicist historian Lionel Casson used the example of Homer's works to show that seaborne raiding was considered a common and legitimate occupation among ancient maritime peoples. The later Athenian historian Thucydides described it as having been "without stigma" before his time.

The development of the ram sometime before the 8th century BC changed the nature of naval warfare, which had until then been a matter of boarding and hand-to-hand fighting. With a heavy projection at the foot of the bow, sheathed with metal, usually bronze, a ship could incapacitate an enemy ship by punching a hole in its planking. The relative speed and nimbleness of ships became important, since a slower ship could be outmaneuvered and disabled by a faster one. The earliest designs had only one row of rowers that sat in undecked hulls, rowing against tholes, or oarports, that were placed directly along the railings. The practical upper limit for wooden constructions fast and maneuverable enough for warfare was around 25–30 oars per side. By adding another level of oars, a development that occurred no later than c. 750 BC, the galley could be made shorter with as many rowers, while making them strong enough to be effective ramming weapons.

The emergence of more advanced states and intensified competition between them spurred on the development of advanced galleys with multiple banks of rowers. During the middle of the first millennium BC, the Mediterranean powers developed successively larger and more complex vessels, the most advanced being the classical trireme with up to 170 rowers. Triremes fought several important engagements in the naval battles of the Greco-Persian Wars (502–449 BC) and the Peloponnesian War (431–404 BC), including the Battle of Aegospotami in 405 BC, which sealed the defeat of Athens by Sparta and its allies. The trireme was an advanced ship that was expensive to build and to maintain due its large crew. By the 5th century, advanced war galleys had been developed that required sizable states with an advanced economy to build and maintain. It was associated with the latest in warship technology around the 4th century BC and could only be employed by an advanced state with an advanced economy and administration. They required considerable skill to row and oarsmen were mostly free citizens who had years of experience at the oar.

Hellenistic era and rise of the Republic

As civilizations around the Mediterranean grew in size and complexity, both their navies and the galleys that made up their numbers became successively larger. The basic design of two or three rows of oars remained the same, but more rowers were added to each oar. The exact reasons are not known, but are believed to have been caused by addition of more troops and the use of more advanced ranged weapons on ships, such as catapults. The size of the new naval forces also made it difficult to find enough skilled rowers for the one-man-per-oar system of the earliest triremes. With more than one man per oar, a single rower could set the pace for the others to follow, meaning that more unskilled rowers could be employed.

The successor states of Alexander the Great's empire built galleys that were like triremes or biremes in oar layout, but manned with additional rowers for each oar. The ruler Dionysius I of Syracuse (c. 432–367 BC) is credited with pioneering the "five" and "six", meaning five or six rows of rowers plying two or three rows of oars. Ptolemy II (283–46 BC) is known to have built a large fleet of very large galleys with several experimental designs rowed by everything from 12 up to 40 rows of rowers, though most of these are considered to have been quite impractical. Fleets with large galleys were put in action in conflicts such as the Punic Wars (246–146 BC) between the Roman Republic and Carthage, which included massive naval battles with hundreds of vessels and tens of thousands of soldiers, seamen, and rowers.

Most of the surviving documentary evidence comes from Greek and Roman shipping, though it is likely that merchant galleys all over the Mediterranean were highly similar. In Greek they were referred to as histiokopos ("sail-oar-er") to reflect that they relied on both types of propulsion. In Latin they were called actuaria (navis) ("ship that moves"), stressing that they were capable of making progress regardless of weather conditions. As an example of the speed and reliability, during an instance of the famous "Carthago delenda est" speech, Cato the Elder demonstrated the close proximity of the Roman arch enemy Carthage by displaying a fresh fig to his audience that he claimed had been picked in North Africa only three days past. Other cargoes carried by galleys were honey, cheese, meat, and live animals intended for gladiator combat. The Romans had several types of merchant galleys that specialized in various tasks, out of which the actuaria with up to 50 rowers was the most versatile, including the phaselus (lit. "bean pod") for passenger transport and the lembus, a small-scale express carrier. Many of these designs continued to be used until the Middle Ages.

Roman Imperial era

The Battle of Actium in 31 BC between the forces of Augustus and Mark Antony marked the peak of the Roman fleet arm. After Augustus' victory at Actium, most of the Roman fleet was dismantled and burned. The Roman civil wars were fought mostly by land forces, and from the 160s until the 4th century AD, no major fleet actions were recorded. During this time, most of the galley crews were disbanded or employed for entertainment purposes in mock battles or in handling the sail-like sun-screens in the larger Roman arenas. What fleets remained were treated as auxiliaries of the land forces, and galley crewmen themselves called themselves milites, "soldiers", rather than nautae, "sailors".

The Roman galley fleets were turned into provincial patrol forces that were smaller and relied largely on liburnians, compact biremes with 25 pairs of oars. These were named after an Illyrian tribe known by Romans for their sea roving practices, and these smaller craft were based on, or inspired by, their vessels of choice. The liburnians and other small galleys patrolled the rivers of continental Europe and reached as far as the Baltic, where they were used to fight local uprisings and assist in checking foreign invasions. The Romans maintained numerous bases around the empire: along the rivers of Central Europe, chains of forts along the northern European coasts and the British Isles, Mesopotamia, and North Africa, including Trabzon, Vienna, Belgrade, Dover, Seleucia, and Alexandria. Few actual galley battles in the provinces are found in records. One action in 70 AD at the unspecified location of the "Island of the Batavians" during the Batavian Rebellion was recorded, and included a trireme as the Roman flagship. The last provincial fleet, the classis Britannica, was reduced by the late 200s, though there was a minor upswing under the rule of Constantine (272–337). His rule also saw the last major naval battle of the unified Roman Empire (before the permanent split into Western and Eastern [later "Byzantine"] Empires), the Battle of Hellespont of 324. Some time after Hellespont, the classical trireme fell out of use, and its design was forgotten.

Middle Ages
A transition from galley to sailing vessels as the most common types of warships began in the High Middle Ages (c. 11th century). Large high-sided sailing ships had always been formidable obstacles for galleys. To low-freeboard oared vessels, the bulkier sailing ships, the cog and the carrack, were almost like floating fortresses, being difficult to board and even harder to capture. Galleys remained useful as warships throughout the entire Middle Ages because of their maneuverability. Sailing ships of the time had only one mast, usually with just a single, large square sail. This made them cumbersome to steer and it was virtually impossible to sail into the wind direction. Galleys therefore were still the only ship type capable of coastal raiding and amphibious landings, both key elements of medieval warfare.

Eastern Mediterranean
In the eastern Mediterranean, the Byzantine Empire struggled with the incursion from invading Muslim Arabs from the 7th century, leading to fierce competition, a buildup of fleet, and war galleys of increasing size. Soon after conquering Egypt and the Levant, the Arab rulers built ships highly similar to Byzantine dromons with the help of local Coptic shipwrights from former Byzantine naval bases. By the 9th century, the struggle between the Byzantines and Arabs had turned the Eastern Mediterranean into a no-man's land for merchant activity. In the 820s Crete was captured by Andalusian Muslims displaced by a failed revolt against the Emirate of Cordoba, turning the island into a base for (galley) attacks on Christian shipping until the island was recaptured by the Byzantines in 960.

Western Mediterranean
In the western Mediterranean and Atlantic, the division of the Carolingian Empire in the late 9th century brought on a period of instability, meaning increased piracy and raiding in the Mediterranean, particularly by newly arrived Muslim invaders. The situation was worsened by raiding Scandinavian Vikings who used longships, vessels that in many ways were very close to galleys in design and functionality and also employed similar tactics. To counter the threat, local rulers began to build large oared vessels, some with up to 30 pairs of oars, that were larger, faster, and with higher sides than Viking ships. Scandinavian expansion, including incursions into the Mediterranean and attacks on both Muslim Iberia and even Constantinople itself, subsided by the mid-11th century. By this time, greater stability in merchant traffic was achieved by the emergence of Christian kingdoms such as those of France, Hungary, and Poland. Around the same time, Italian port towns and city states, like Venice, Pisa, and Amalfi, rose on the fringes of the Byzantine Empire as it struggled with eastern threats.

After the advent of Islam and Muslim conquests of the 7th and 8th century, the old Mediterranean economy collapsed and the volume of trade went down drastically. The Eastern Roman (Byzantine) Empire, neglected to revive overland trade routes but was dependent on keeping the sea lanes open to keep the empire together. Bulk trade fell around 600–750 while the luxury trade increased. Galleys remained in service, but were profitable mainly in the luxury trade, which set off their high maintenance cost. In the 10th century, there was a sharp increase in piracy which resulted in larger ships with more numerous crews. These were mostly built by the growing city-states of Italy which were emerging as the dominant sea powers, including Venice, Genoa, and Pisa. Inheriting the Byzantine ship designs, the new merchant galleys were similar dromons, but without any heavy weapons and both faster and wider. They could be manned by crews of up to 1,000 men and were employed in both trade and warfare. A further boost to the development of the large merchant galleys was the upswing in Western European pilgrims traveling to the Holy Land.

In Northern Europe, Viking longships and their derivations, knarrs, dominated trading and shipping, though developed separately from the Mediterranean galley tradition.
In the South, galleys continued to be useful for trade even as sailing vessels evolved more efficient hulls and rigging; since they could hug the shoreline and make steady progress when winds failed, they were highly reliable. The zenith in the design of merchant galleys came with the state-owned great galleys of the Venetian Republic, first built in the 1290s. These were used to carry the lucrative trade in luxuries from the east such as spices, silks, and gems. They were in all respects larger than contemporary war galleys (up to 46 m) and had a deeper draft, with more room for cargo (140–250 t). With a full complement of rowers ranging from 150 to 180 men, all available to defend the ship from attack, they were also very safe modes of travel. This attracted a business of carrying affluent pilgrims to the Holy Land, a trip that could be accomplished in as little 29 days on the route Venice–Jaffa, despite landfalls for rest and watering or for respite from rough weather.

Development of the true galley
Late medieval maritime warfare was divided in two distinct regions. In the Mediterranean galleys were used for raiding along coasts, and in the constant fighting for naval bases. In the Atlantic and Baltic there was greater focus on sailing ships that were used mostly for troop transport, with galleys providing fighting support. Galleys were still widely used in the north and were the most numerous warships used by Mediterranean powers with interests in the north, especially the French and Iberian kingdoms.

During the 13th and 14th century, the galley evolved into the design that was to remain essentially the same until it was phased out in the early 19th century. The new type descended from the ships used by Byzantine and Muslim fleets in the Early Middle Ages. These were the mainstay of all Christian powers until the 14th century, including the great maritime republics of Genoa and Venice, the Papacy, the Hospitallers, Aragon, and Castile, as well as by various pirates and corsairs. The overall term used for these types of vessels was gallee sottili ("slender galleys"). The later Ottoman navy used similar designs, but they were generally faster under sail, and smaller, but slower under oars. Galley designs were intended solely for close action with hand-held weapons and projectile weapons like bows and crossbows. In the 13th century the Iberian Crown of Aragon built several fleet of galleys with high castles, manned with Catalan crossbowmen, and regularly defeated numerically superior Angevin forces.

From the first half of the 14th century the Venetian galere da mercato ("merchantman galleys") were being built in the shipyards of the state-run Arsenal as "a combination of state enterprise and private association, the latter being a kind of consortium of export merchants", as Fernand Braudel described them. The ships sailed in convoy, defended by archers and slingsmen (ballestieri) aboard, and later carrying cannons. In Genoa, the other major maritime power of the time, galleys and ships in general were more produced by smaller private ventures.

In the 14th and 15th centuries merchant galleys traded high-value goods and carried passengers. Major routes in the time of the early Crusades carried the pilgrim traffic to the Holy Land. Later routes linked ports around the Mediterranean, between the Mediterranean and the Black Sea (a grain trade soon squeezed off by the Turkish capture of Constantinople, 1453) and between the Mediterranean and Brugeswhere the first Genoese galley arrived at Sluys in 1277, the first Venetian galere in 1314and Southampton. Although primarily sailing vessels, they used oars to enter and leave many trading ports of call, the most effective way of entering and leaving the Lagoon of Venice. The Venetian galera, beginning at 100 tons and built as large as 300, was not the largest merchantman of its day, when the Genoese carrack of the 15th century might exceed 1000 tons. In 1447, for instance, Florentine galleys planned to call at 14 ports on their way to and from Alexandria. The availability of oars enabled these ships to navigate close to the shore where they could exploit land and sea breezes and coastal currents, to work reliable and comparatively fast passages against the prevailing wind. The large crews also provided protection against piracy. These ships were very seaworthy; a Florentine great galley left Southampton on 23 February 1430 and returned to its port at Pisa in 32 days. They were so safe that merchandise was often not insured. These ships increased in size during this period, and were the template from which the galleass developed.

Transition to sailing ships
During the early 15th century, sailing ships began to dominate naval warfare in northern waters. While the galley still remained the primary warship in southern waters, a similar transition had begun also among the Mediterranean powers. A Castilian naval raid on the island of Jersey in 1405 became the first recorded battle where a Mediterranean power employed a naval force consisting mostly of cogs or nefs, rather than the oared-powered galleys. The Battle of Gibraltar between Castile and Portugal in 1476 was another important sign of change; it was the first recorded battle where the primary combatants were full-rigged ships armed with wrought-iron guns on the upper decks and in the waists, foretelling of the slow decline of the war galley.

The sailing vessel was always at the mercy of the wind for propulsion, and those that did carry oars were placed at a disadvantage because they were not optimized for oar use. The galley did have disadvantages compared to the sailing vessel though. Their smaller hulls were not able to hold as much cargo and this limited their range as the crews were required to replenish food stuffs more frequently. The low freeboard of the galley meant that in close action with a sailing vessel, the sailing vessel would usually maintain a height advantage. The sailing vessel could also fight more effectively farther out at sea and in rougher wind conditions because of the height of their freeboard.

Under sail, an oared warship was placed at much greater risk as a result of the piercings for the oars which were required to be near the waterline and would allow water to ingress into the galley if the vessel heeled too far to one side. These advantages and disadvantages led the galley to be and remain a primarily coastal vessel. The shift to sailing vessels in the Mediterranean was the result of the negation of some of the galley's advantages as well as the adoption of gunpowder weapons on a much larger institutional scale. The sailing vessel was propelled in a different manner than the galley but the tactics were often the same until the 16th century. The real-estate afforded to the sailing vessel to place larger cannons and other armament mattered little because early gunpowder weapons had limited range and were expensive to produce. The eventual creation of cast iron cannons allowed vessels and armies to be outfitted much more cheaply. The cost of gunpowder also fell in this period.

The armament of both vessel types varied between larger weapons such as bombards and the smaller swivel guns. For logistical purposes it became convenient for those with larger shore establishments to standardize upon a given size of cannon. Traditionally the English in the North and the Venetians in the Mediterranean are seen as some the earliest to move in this direction. The improving sail rigs of northern vessels also allowed them to navigate in the coastal waters of the Mediterranean to a much larger degree than before. Aside from warships the decrease in the cost of gunpowder weapons also led to the arming of merchants. The larger vessels of the north continued to mature while the galley retained its defining characteristics. Attempts were made to stave this off such as the addition of fighting castles in the bow, but such additions to counter the threats brought by larger sailing vessels often offset the advantages of galley.

Introduction of guns

From around 1450, three major naval powers established a dominance over different parts of the Mediterranean using galleys as their primary weapons at sea: the Ottomans in the east, Venice in the center and Habsburg Spain in the west. The core of their fleets were concentrated in the three major, wholly dependable naval bases in the Mediterranean: Constantinople, Venice, and Barcelona. Naval warfare in the 16th century Mediterranean was fought mostly on a smaller scale, with raiding and minor actions dominating. Only three truly major fleet engagements were actually fought in the 16th century: the battles of Preveza in 1538, Djerba in 1560, and Lepanto in 1571. Lepanto became the last large all-galley battle ever, and was also one of the largest battle in terms of participants anywhere in early modern Europe before the Napoleonic Wars.

The Mediterranean powers also employed galley forces for conflicts outside the Mediterranean. Spain sent galley squadrons to the Netherlands during the later stages of the Eighty Years' War which successfully operated against Dutch forces in the enclosed, shallow coastal waters. From the late 1560s, galleys were also used to transport silver to Genoese bankers to finance Spanish troops against the Dutch uprising. Galleasses and galleys were part of an invasion force of over 16,000 men that conquered the Azores in 1583. Around 2,000 galley rowers were on board ships of the famous 1588 Spanish Armada, though few of these actually made it to the battle itself. Outside European and Middle Eastern waters, Spain built galleys to deal with pirates and privateers in both the Caribbean and the Philippines. Ottoman galleys contested the Portuguese intrusion in the Indian Ocean in the 16th century, but failed against the high-sided, massive Portuguese carracks in open waters.

Even though the carracks themselves were soon surpassed by other types of sailing vessels, their greater range, great size, and high superstructures, armed with numerous wrought iron guns easily outmatched the short-ranged, low-freeboard Turkish galleys. The Spanish used galleys to more success in their colonial possessions in the Caribbean and the Philippines to hunt pirates and sporadically used them in the Netherlands and the Bay of Biscay. Spain maintained four permanent galley squadrons to guard its coasts and trade routes against the Ottomans, the French, and their corsairs. Together they formed the largest galley navy in the Mediterranean in the early 17th century. They were the backbone of the Spanish Mediterranean war fleet and were used for ferrying troops, supplies, horses, and munitions to Spain's Italian and African possessions. In Southeast Asia during the 16th and early 17th century, the Aceh Sultanate had fleets of up to 100 native galleys (ghali) as well as smaller rowed vessels, such as lancarans, galliots, and fustas. Some of the larger vessels were very large with heavier armament than standard Mediterranean galleys, with raised platforms for infantry and some with stern structures similar in height to that of contemporary galleons.

Galleys had been synonymous with warships in the Mediterranean for at least 2,000 years, and continued to fulfill that role with the invention of gunpowder and heavy artillery. Though early 20th-century historians often dismissed the galleys as hopelessly outclassed with the first introduction of naval artillery on sailing ships, it was the galley that was favored by the introduction of heavy naval guns. Galleys were a more "mature" technology with long-established tactics and traditions of supporting social institutions and naval organizations. In combination with the intensified conflicts this led to a substantial increase in the size of galley fleets from c. 1520–80, above all in the Mediterranean, but also in other European theatres. Galleys and similar oared vessels remained uncontested as the most effective gun-armed warships in theory until the 1560s, and in practice for a few decades more, and were actually considered a grave risk to sailing warships. They could effectively fight other galleys, attack sailing ships in calm weather or in unfavorable winds (or deny them action if needed) and act as floating siege batteries. They were also unequaled in their amphibious capabilities, even at extended ranges, as exemplified by French interventions as far north as Scotland in the mid-16th century.

Heavy artillery on galleys was mounted in the bow, which aligned easily with the long-standing tactical tradition of attacking head on, bow first. The ordnance on galleys was heavy from its introduction in the 1480s, and capable of quickly demolishing the high, thin medieval stone walls that still prevailed in the 16th century. This temporarily upended the strength of older seaside fortresses, which had to be rebuilt to cope with gunpowder weapons. The addition of guns also improved the amphibious abilities of galleys as they could make assaults supported with heavy firepower, and were even more effectively defended when beached stern-first. An accumulation and generalizing of bronze cannons and small firearms in the Mediterranean during the 16th century increased the cost of warfare, but also made those dependent on them more resilient to manpower losses. Older ranged weapons, like bows or even crossbows, required considerable skill to handle, sometimes a lifetime of practice, while gunpowder weapons required considerably less training to use successfully. According to a highly influential study by military historian John F. Guilmartin, this transition in warfare, along with the introduction of much cheaper cast iron guns in the 1580s, proved the "death knell" for the war galley as a significant military vessel. Gunpowder weapons began to displace men as the fighting power of armed forces, making individual soldiers more deadly and effective. As offensive weapons, firearms could be stored for years with minimal maintenance and did not require the expenses associated with soldiers. Manpower could thus be exchanged for capital investments, something which benefited sailing vessels that were already far more economical in their use of manpower. It also served to increase their strategic range and to out-compete galleys as fighting ships.

Mediterranean decline

Atlantic-style warfare based on large, heavily armed sailing ships began to change naval warfare in the Mediterranean in the early 17th century. In 1616, a small Spanish squadron of five galleons and a patache was used to cruise the eastern Mediterranean and defeated a fleet of 55 galleys at the Battle of Cape Celidonia. By 1650, war galleys were used primarily in the wars between Venice and the Ottoman Empire in their struggle for strategic island and coastal trading bases and until the 1720s by both France and Spain but for largely amphibious and cruising operations or in combination with heavy sailing ships in a major battle, where they played specialized roles. An example of this was when a Spanish fleet used its galleys in a mixed naval/amphibious battle in the second 1641 battle of Tarragona, to break a French naval blockade and land troops and supplies. Even the Venetians, Ottomans, and other Mediterranean powers began to build Atlantic style warships for use in the Mediterranean in the latter part of the century. Christian and Muslim corsairs had been using galleys in sea roving and in support of the major powers in times of war, but largely replaced them with xebecs, various sail/oar hybrids, and a few remaining light galleys in the early 17th century.

No large all-galley battles were fought after the gigantic clash at Lepanto in 1571, and galleys were mostly used as cruisers or for supporting sailing warships as a rearguard in fleet actions, similar to the duties performed by frigates outside the Mediterranean. They could assist damaged ships out of the line, but generally only in very calm weather, as was the case at the Battle of Málaga in 1704. They could also defeat larger ships that were isolated, as when in 1651 a squadron of Spanish galleys captured a French galleon at Formentera. For small states and principalities as well as groups of private merchants, galleys were more affordable than large and complex sailing warships, and were used as defense against piracy. Galleys required less timber to build, the design was relatively simple and they carried fewer guns. They were tactically flexible and could be used for naval ambushes as well amphibious operations. They also required few skilled seamen and were difficult for sailing ships to catch, but vital in hunting down and catching other galleys and oared raiders.

Among the largest galley fleets in the 17th century were operated by the two major Mediterranean powers, France and Spain. France had by the 1650s become the most powerful state in Europe, and expanded its galley forces under the rule of the absolutist "Sun King" Louis XIV. In the 1690s the French galley corps (corps des galères) reached its all-time peak with more than 50 vessels manned by over 15,000 men and officers, becoming the largest galley fleet in the world at the time. Though there was intense rivalry between France and Spain, not a single galley battle occurred between the two great powers during this period, and virtually no naval battles between other nations either. During the War of the Spanish Succession, French galleys were involved in actions against Antwerp and Harwich, but due to the intricacies of alliance politics there were never any Franco-Spanish galley clashes. In the first half of the 18th century, the other major naval powers in the Mediterranean Sea, the Order of Saint John based in Malta, and of the Papal States in central Italy, cut down drastically on their galley forces. Despite the lack of action, the galley corps received vast resources (25–50% of the French naval expenditures) during the 1660s. It was maintained as a functional fighting force right up until its abolition in 1748, though its primary function was more of a symbol of Louis XIV's absolutist ambitions.
The last recorded battle in the Mediterranean where galleys played a significant part was at Matapan in 1717, between the Ottomans and Venice and its allies, though they had little influence on the outcome. Few large-scale naval battles were fought in the Mediterranean throughout most of the remainder of the 18th century. The Tuscan galley fleet was dismantled around 1718, Naples had only four old vessels by 1734 and the French Galley Corps had ceased to exist as an independent arm in 1748. Venice, the Papal States, and the Knights of Malta were the only state fleets that maintained galleys, though in nothing like their previous quantities. By 1790, there were fewer than 50 galleys in service among all the Mediterranean powers, half of which belonged to Venice.

Use in northern Europe

Oared vessels remained in use in northern waters for a long time, though in subordinate role and in particular circumstances. In the Italian Wars, French galleys brought up from the Mediterranean to the Atlantic posed a serious threat to the early English Tudor navy during coastal operations. The response came in the building of a considerable fleet of oared vessels, including hybrids with a complete three-masted rig, as well as a Mediterranean-style galleys (that were even attempted to be manned with convicts and slaves). Under King Henry VIII, the English navy used several kinds of vessels that were adapted to local needs. English galliasses (very different from the Mediterranean vessel of the same name) were employed to cover the flanks of larger naval forces while pinnaces and rowbarges were used for scouting or even as a backup for the longboats and tenders for the larger sailing ships. During the Dutch Revolt (1566–1609) both the Dutch and Spanish found galleys useful for amphibious operations in the many shallow waters around the Low Countries where deep-draft sailing vessels could not enter.

While galleys were too vulnerable to be used in large numbers in the open waters of the Atlantic, they were well-suited for use in much of the Baltic Sea by Denmark-Norway, Sweden, Russia, and some of the Central European powers with ports on the southern coast. There were two types of naval battlegrounds in the Baltic. One was the open sea, suitable for large sailing fleets; the other was the coastal areas and especially the chain of small islands and archipelagos that ran almost uninterrupted from Stockholm to the Gulf of Finland. In these areas, conditions were often too calm, cramped, and shallow for sailing ships, but they were excellent for galleys and other oared vessels. Galleys of the Mediterranean type were first introduced in the Baltic Sea around the mid-16th century as competition between the Scandinavian states of Denmark and Sweden intensified. The Swedish galley fleet was the largest outside the Mediterranean, and served as an auxiliary branch of the army. Very little is known about the design of Baltic Sea galleys, except that they were overall smaller than in the Mediterranean and they were rowed by army soldiers rather than convicts or slaves.

Baltic revival and decline

Galleys were introduced to the Baltic Sea in the 16th century but the details of their designs are lacking due to the absence of records. They might have been built in a more regional style, but the only known depiction from the time shows a typical Mediterranean style vessel. There is conclusive evidence that Denmark-Norway became the first Baltic power to build classic Mediterranean-style galleys in the 1660s, though they proved to be generally too large to be useful in the shallow waters of the Baltic archipelagos. Sweden and especially Russia began to launch galleys and various rowed vessels in great numbers during the Great Northern War in the first two decades of the 18th century. Sweden was late in the game when it came to building an effective oared fighting fleet (skärgårdsflottan, the archipelago fleet, officially arméns flotta, the fleet of the army), while the Russian galley forces under Tsar Peter I developed into a supporting arm for the sailing navy and a well-functioning auxiliary of the army which infiltrated and conducted numerous raids on the eastern Swedish coast in the 1710s.

Sweden and Russia became the two main competitors for Baltic dominance in the 18th century, and built the largest galley fleets in the world at the time. They were used for amphibious operations in Russo-Swedish wars of 1741–43 and 1788–90. The last galleys ever constructed were built in 1796 by Russia, and remained in service well into the 19th century, but saw little action. The last time galleys were deployed in action was when the Russian navy was attacked in Åbo (Turku) in 1854 as part of the Crimean War. In the second half of the 18th century, the role of Baltic galleys in coastal fleets was replaced first with hybrid "archipelago frigates" (such as the turuma or pojama) and xebecs, and after the 1790s with various types of gunboats.

Both the Russian and Swedish navies were based on a form of conscription, and both navies used conscripts as galley rowers. This had several advantages over convicts or slaves: the rowers could be armed to fight as marines, they could be also used as land soldiers and invasion force, and were more skilled than forced labor. Since most naval conscripts came from coastal parishes and towns, most were already experienced seafarers when they entered the service.

Construction

Galleys have since their first appearance in ancient times been intended as highly maneuverable vessels, independent of winds by being rowed, and usually with a focus on speed under oars. The profile has therefore been that of a markedly elongated hull with a ratio of breadth to length at the waterline of at least 1:5, and in the case of ancient Mediterranean galleys as much as 1:10 with a small draught, the measurement of how much of a ship's structure that is submerged under water. To make it possible to efficiently row the vessels, the freeboard (the height of the railing above the surface of the water) was by necessity kept low. This gave oarsmen enough leverage to row efficiently, but at the expense of seaworthiness. These design characteristics made the galley fast and maneuverable, but more vulnerable to rough weather.

The documentary evidence for the construction of ancient galleys is fragmentary, particularly in pre-Roman times. Plans and schematics in the modern sense did not exist until the 17th century and nothing like them has survived from ancient times. How galleys were constructed has therefore been a matter of looking at circumstantial evidence in literature, art, coinage and monuments that include ships, some of them actually in natural size. Since the war galleys floated even with a ruptured hull and virtually never had any ballast or heavy cargo that could sink them, not a single wreck of one has so far been found. The only exception has been a partial wreck of a small Punic liburnian from the Roman era, the Marsala Ship.

On the funerary monument of the Egyptian king Sahure (2487–2475 BC) in Abusir, there are relief images of vessels with a marked sheer (the upward curvature at each end of the hull) and seven pairs of oars along its side, a number that was likely to have been merely symbolical, and steering oars in the stern. They have one mast, all lowered and vertical posts at stem and stern, with the front decorated with an Eye of Horus, the first example of such a decoration. It was later used by other Mediterranean cultures to decorate seagoing craft in the belief that it helped to guide the ship safely to its destination. These early galleys apparently lacked a keel meaning they lacked stiffness along their length. Therefore, they had large cables connecting stem and stern resting on massive crutches on deck. They were held in tension to avoid hogging, or bending the ship's construction upward in the middle, while at sea. In the 15th century BC, Egyptian galleys were still depicted with the distinctive extreme sheer, but had by then developed the distinctive forward-curving stern decorations with ornaments in the shape of lotus flowers. They had possibly developed a primitive type of keel, but still retained the large cables intended to prevent hogging.

The design of the earliest oared vessels is mostly unknown and highly conjectural. They likely used a mortise construction, but were sewn together rather than pinned together with nails and dowels. Being completely open, they were rowed (or even paddled) from the open deck, and likely had "ram entries", projections from the bow lowered the resistance of moving through water, making them slightly more hydrodynamic. The first true galleys, the triaconters (literally "thirty-oarers") and penteconters ("fifty-oarers") were developed from these early designs and set the standard for the larger designs that would come later. They were rowed on only one level, which made them fairly slow, likely only 5–5.5 knots. By the 8th century BC the first galleys rowed at two levels had been developed, among the earliest being the two-level penteconters which were considerably shorter than the one-level equivalents, and therefore more maneuverable. They were an estimated 25 m in length and displaced 15 tonnes with 25 pairs of oars. These could have reached an estimated top speed of up to 7.5 knots, making them the first genuine warships when fitted with bow rams. They were equipped with a single square sail on mast set roughly halfway along the length of the hull.

Trireme

By the 5th century BC, the first triremes were in use by various powers in the eastern Mediterranean. It had now become a fully developed, highly specialized vessel of war that was capable of high speeds and complex maneuvers. At nearly 40 m in length, displacing almost 50 tonnes, it was more than three times as expensive as a two-level penteconter. A trireme also had an additional mast with a smaller square sail placed near the bow. Up to 170 oarsmen sat on three levels with one oar each that varied slightly in length. To accommodate three levels of oars, rowers sat staggered on three levels. Arrangements of the three levels are believed to have varied, but the most well-documented design made use of a projecting structure, or outrigger, where the oarlock in the form of a thole pin was placed. This allowed the outermost row of oarsmen enough leverage for full strokes that made efficient use of their oars.

The first dedicated war galleys fitted with rams were built with a mortise and tenon technique, a so-called shell-first method. In this, the planking of the hull was strong enough to hold the ship together structurally, and was also watertight without the need for caulking. Hulls had sharp bottoms without keelsons in order to support the structure and were reinforced by transverse framing secured with dowels with nails driven through them. To prevent the hull from hogging there was a hypozoma (υπόζωμα = underbelt), a thick, doubled rope that connected bow with stern. It was kept taut to add strength to the construction along its length, but its exact design or the method of tightening is not known. The ram, the primary weapon of ancient galleys from around the 8th to the 4th century, was not attached directly on the hull but to a structure extending from it. This way the ram could twist off if got stuck after ramming rather than breaking the integrity of the hull. The ram fitting consisted of a massive, projecting timber and the ram itself was a thick bronze casting with horizontal blades that could weigh from 400 kg up to 2 tonnes.

Roman era
Galleys from 4th century BC up to the time of the early Roman Empire in the 1st century AD became successively larger. Three levels of oars was the practical upper limit, but it was improved on by making ships longer, broader, and heavier and placing more than one rower per oar. Naval conflict grew more intense and extensive, and by 100 BC galleys with four, five or six rows of oarsmen were commonplace and carried large complements of soldiers and catapults. With high freeboard (up to 3 m) and additional tower structures from which missiles could be shot down onto enemy decks, they were intended to be like floating fortresses. Designs with everything from eight rows of oarsmen and upward were built, but most of them are believed to have been impractical show pieces never used in actual warfare. Ptolemy IV, the Greek pharaoh of Egypt 221–205 BC, is recorded as building a gigantic ship with forty rows of oarsmen, though no specification of its design remains. One suggested design was that of a huge trireme catamaran with up to 14 men per oar and it is assumed that it was intended as a showpiece rather than a practical warship.

With the consolidation of Roman imperial power, the size of both fleets and galleys decreased considerably. The huge polyremes disappeared and the fleet were equipped primarily with triremes and liburnians, compact biremes with 25 pairs of oars that were well suited for patrol duty and chasing down raiders and pirates. In the northern provinces oared patrol boats were employed to keep local tribes in check along the shores of rivers like the Rhine and the Danube. As the need for large warships disappeared, the design of the trireme, the pinnacle of ancient war ship design, fell into obscurity and was eventually forgotten. The last known reference to triremes in battle is dated to 324 at the Battle of the Hellespont. In the late 5th century the Byzantine historian Zosimus declared the knowledge of how to build them to have been long since forgotten.

Middle Ages
The earliest medieval galley specification comes from an order of Charles I of Sicily, in 1275 AD. Overall length 39.30 m, keel length 28.03 m, depth 2.08 m. Hull width 3.67 m. Width between outriggers 4.45 m. 108 oars, most 6.81 m long, some 7.86 m, 2 steering oars 6.03 m long. Foremast and middle mast respectively heights 16.08 m, 11.00 m; circumference both 0.79 m, yard lengths 26.72 m, 17.29 m. Overall deadweight tonnage approximately 80 metric tons. This type of vessel had two, later three, men on a bench, each working his own oar. This vessel had much longer oars than the Athenian trireme which were 4.41 m & 4.66 m long. This type of warship was called galia sottil.

The dromon and the galea

The primary warship of the Byzantine navy until the 12th century was the dromon and other similar ship types. Considered an evolution of the Roman liburnian, the term first appeared in the late 5th century, and was commonly used for a specific kind of war-galley by the 6th century. The term dromōn (literally "runner") itself comes from the Greek root drom-(áō), "to run", and 6th-century authors like Procopius are explicit in their references to the speed of these vessels. During the next few centuries, as the naval struggle with the Arabs intensified, heavier versions with two or possibly even three banks of oars evolved.

The accepted view is that the main developments which differentiated the early dromons from the liburnians, and that henceforth characterized Mediterranean galleys, were the adoption of a full deck, the abandonment of rams on the bow in favor of an above-water spur, and the gradual introduction of lateen sails. The exact reasons for the abandonment of the ram are unclear. Depictions of upward-pointing beaks in the 4th-century Vatican Vergil manuscript may well illustrate that the ram had already been replaced by a spur in late Roman galleys. One possibility is that the change occurred because of the gradual evolution of the ancient shell-first construction method, against which rams had been designed, into the skeleton-first method, which produced a stronger and more flexible hull, less susceptible to ram attacks. At least by the early 7th century, the ram's original function had been forgotten.

The dromons that Procopius described were single-banked ships of probably 25 oars per side. Unlike ancient vessels, which used an outrigger, these extended directly from the hull. In the later bireme dromons of the 9th and 10th centuries, the two oar banks were divided by the deck, with the first oar bank was situated below, whilst the second oar bank was situated above deck; these rowers were expected to fight alongside the marines in boarding operations. The overall length of these ships was probably about 32 meters. The stern (prymnē) had a tent that covered the captain's berth; the prow featured an elevated forecastle that acted as a fighting platform and could house one or more siphons for the discharge of Greek fire; and on the largest dromons, there were wooden castles on either side between the masts, providing archers with elevated firing platforms. The bow spur was intended to ride over an enemy ship's oars, breaking them and rendering it helpless against missile fire and boarding actions.

Standardization
From the 12th century, the design of war galleys evolved into the form that would remain largely the same until the building of the last war galleys in the late 18th century. The length to breadth-ratio was a minimum of 8:1. A rectangular telaro, an outrigger, was added to support the oars and the rowers' benches were laid out in a diagonal herringbone pattern angled aft on either side of a central gangway, or corsia. It was based on the form of the galea, the smaller Byzantine galleys, and would be known mostly by the Italian term galea sottile (literally "slender galley"). A second, smaller mast was added sometime in the 13th century and the number of rowers rose from two to three rowers per bench as a standard from the late 13th to the early 14th century. The galee sottili would make up the bulk the main war fleets of every major naval power in the Mediterranean, assisted by the smaller single-masted galiotte, as well as the Christian and Muslim corsairs fleets. Ottoman galleys were very similar in design, though in general smaller, faster under sail, but slower under oars. The standard size of the galley remained stable from the 14th until the early 16th century, when the introduction of naval artillery began to have effects on design and tactics.

The traditional two side rudders were complemented with a stern rudder sometime after c. 1400 and eventually the side rudders disappeared altogether. It was also during the 15th century that large artillery pieces were first mounted on galleys. Burgundian records from the mid-15th century describe galleys with some form of guns, but do not specify the size. The first conclusive evidence of a large cannon mounted on a galley comes from a woodcut of a Venetian galley in 1486. The first guns were fixed directly on timbers in the bow and aimed directly forward, a placement that would remain largely unchanged until the galley disappeared from active service in the 19th century.

With the introduction of guns in the bows of galleys, a permanent wooden structure called rambade (French: rambade; Italian: rambata; Spanish: arrumbada) was introduced. The rambade became standard on virtually all galleys in the early 16th century. There were some variations in the navies of different Mediterranean powers, but the overall layout was the same. The forward-aiming battery was covered by a wooden platform which gave gunners a minimum of protection, and functioned as both a staging area for boarding attacks and as a firing platform for on-board soldiers. After its introduction, the rambade became a standard detail on every fighting galley until the very end of galley era in the early 19th century.

In the mid-17th century, galleys reached what has been described as their "final form". Galleys had looked more or less the same for over four centuries and a fairly standardized classification system for different sizes of galleys had been developed by the Mediterranean bureaucracies, based mostly on the number of benches in a vessel. A Mediterranean galley would have 25–26 pairs of oars with five men per oar (c. 250 rowers), 50–100 sailors and 50–100 soldiers for a total of about 500 men. The exceptions were the significantly larger "flagships" (often called lanternas, "lantern galleys") that had 30 pairs of oars and up to seven rowers per oar. The armament consisted of one heavy 24- or 36-pounder gun in the bows flanked by two to four 4- to 12-pounders. Rows of light swivel guns were often placed along the entire length of the galley on the railings for close-quarter defense. The length-to-width ratio of the ships was about 8:1, with two main masts carrying one large lateen sail each. In the Baltic, galleys were generally shorter with a length-to-width ratio from 5:1 to 7:1, an adaptation to the cramped conditions of the Baltic archipelagos.

A single mainmast was standard on most war galleys until c. 1600. A second, shorter mast could be raised temporarily in the bows, but became permanent by the early 17th century. It was stepped slightly to the side to allow for the recoil of the heavy guns; the other was placed roughly in the center of the ship. A third smaller mast further astern, akin to a mizzen mast, was also introduced on large galleys, possibly in the early 17th century, but was standard at least by the early 18th century. Galleys had little room for provisions and depended on frequent resupplying and were often beached at night to rest the crew and cook meals. Where cooking areas were actually present, they consisted of a clay-lined box with a hearth or similar cooking equipment fitted on the vessel in place of a rowing bench, usually on the port (left) side.

Propulsion
Throughout their long history, galleys relied on rowing as the most important means of propulsion. The arrangement of rowers during the 1st millennium BC developed gradually from a single row up to three rows arranged in a complex, staggered seating arrangement. Anything above three levels, however, proved to be physically impracticable. Initially, there was only one rower per oar, but the number steadily increased, with a number of different combinations of rowers per oar and rows of oars. The ancient terms for galleys was based on the numbers of rows or rowers plying the oars, not the number of rows of oars. Today it is best known by a modernized Latin terminology based on numerals with the ending "-reme" from rēmus, "oar". A trireme was a ship with three rows of oarsmen, a quadrireme four, a hexareme six, and so forth. There were warships that ran up to ten or even eleven rows, but anything above six was rare. A huge forty-rowed ship was built during the reign of Ptolemy IV in Egypt. Little is known about its design, but it is assumed to have been an impractical prestige vessel.

Rowing

Ancient rowing was done in a fixed seated position, the most effective rowing position, with rowers facing the stern. A sliding stroke, which provided the strength from both legs as well as the arms, was suggested by earlier historians, but no conclusive evidence has supported it. Practical experiments with the full-scale reconstruction Olympias has shown that there was insufficient space, while moving or rolling seats would have been highly impractical to construct with ancient methods. Rowers in ancient war galleys sat below the upper deck with little view of their surroundings. The rowing was therefore managed by supervisors, and coordinated with pipes or rhythmic chanting. Galleys were highly maneuverable, able to turn on their axis or even to row backward, though it required a skilled and experienced crew. In galleys with an arrangement of three men per oar, all would be seated, but the rower furthest inboard would perform a stand-and-sit stroke, getting up on his feet to push the oar forward, and then sitting down again to pull it back.

The faster a vessel travels, the more energy it uses. Reaching high speed requires energy which a human-powered vessel is incapable of producing. Oar systems generate very low amounts of energy for propulsion (only about 70 W per rower) and the upper limit for rowing in a fixed position is around 10 knots. Ancient war galleys of the kind used in Classical Greece are by modern historians considered to be the most energy-efficient and fastest of galley designs throughout history. A full-scale replica of a 5th-century BC trireme, the Olympias was built 1985–87 and was put through a series of trials to test its performance. It proved that a cruising speed of 7–8 knots could be maintained for an entire day. Sprinting speeds of up to 10 knots were possible, but only for a few minutes and would tire the crew quickly. Ancient galleys were built very light and the original triremes are assumed to never have been surpassed in speed. Medieval galleys are believed to have been considerably slower, especially since they were not built with ramming tactics in mind. A cruising speed of no more than 2–3 knots has been estimated. A sprint speed of up to 7 knots was possible for 20–30 minutes, but risked exhausting the rowers completely.

Rowing in headwinds or even moderately rough weather was difficult as well as exhausting. In high seas, ancient galleys would set sail to run before the wind. They were highly susceptible to high waves, and could become unmanageable if the rowing frame (apostis) came awash. Ancient and medieval galleys are assumed to have sailed only with the wind more or less astern with a top speed of 8–9 knots in fair conditions.

Galley slaves

Contrary to the popular image of rowers chained to the oars, conveyed by movies such as Ben Hur, there is no evidence that ancient navies ever made use of condemned criminals or slaves as oarsmen, with the possible exception of Ptolemaic Egypt. Literary evidence indicates that Greek and Roman navies relied on paid labor or ordinary soldiers to man their galleys. Slaves were put at the oars only in times of extreme crisis. In some cases, these people were given freedom thereafter, while in others they began their service aboard as free men. Roman merchant vessels (usually sailing vessels) were manned by slaves, sometimes even with slaves as ship's master, but this was seldom the case in merchant galleys.

It was only in the early 16th century that the modern idea of the galley slave became commonplace. Galley fleets as well as the size of individual vessels increased in size, which required more rowers. The number of benches could not be increased without lengthening hulls beyond their structural limits, and more than three oars per bench was not practicable. The demand for more rowers also meant that the relatively limited number of skilled oarsmen could not keep up with the demand of large galley fleets. It became increasingly common to man galleys with convicts or slaves, which required a simpler method of rowing. The older method of employing professional rowers using the alla sensile method (one oar per man, with two to three sharing the same bench) was gradually phased out in favor of rowing a scaloccio, which required less skill. A single large oar was used for each bench, with several rowers working it together and the number of oarsmen per oar rose from three up to five. In some very large command galleys, there could be as many as seven to an oar.

All major Mediterranean powers sentenced criminals to galley service, but initially only in time of war. Christian naval powers such as Spain frequently employed Muslim captives and prisoners of war. The Ottoman navy and its North African corsair allies often put Christian prisoners to the oars, but also mixed volunteers. Spain relied on mostly servile rowers, in great part because its organizational structure was geared toward employing slaves and convicts. Venice was one of few major naval powers that used almost only free rowers, a result of their reliance on alla sensile rowing which required skilled professional rowers. The Knights of Saint John used slaves extensively, as did the Papal States, Florence, and Genoa. North African ghazi corsairs relied almost entirely on Christian slaves for rowers.

Sails
In ancient galleys under sail, most of the moving power came from a single square sail. It was rigged on a mast somewhat forward of the center of the ship with a smaller mast carrying a head sail in the bow. Triangular lateen sails are attested as early as the 2nd century AD, and gradually became the sail of choice for galleys. By the 9th century, lateens were firmly established as part of the standard galley rig. The lateen rig was more complicated and required a larger crew to handle than a square sail rig, but this was not a problem in the heavily manned galleys. Belisarius' Byzantine invasion fleet of 533 was at least partly fitted with lateen sails, making it probable that by the time the lateen had become the standard rig for the dromon, with the traditional square sail gradually falling from use in medieval navigation in the Mediterranean. Unlike a square sail rig, the spar of a lateen sail did not pivot around the mast. To change tacks, the entire spar had to be lifted over the mast and to the other side. Since the spar was often much longer than the mast itself, and not much shorter than the ship itself, it was a complex and time-consuming maneuver.

Armament and tactics

In the earliest times of naval warfare boarding was the only means of deciding a naval engagement, but little to nothing is known about the tactics involved. In the first recorded naval battle in history, the Battle of the Delta, the forces of Egyptian Pharaoh Ramesses III won a decisive victory over a force made up of the enigmatic group known as the Sea Peoples. As shown in commemorative reliefs of the battle, Egyptian archers on ships and the nearby shores of the Nile rain down arrows on the enemy ships. At the same time Egyptian galleys engage in boarding action and capsize the ships of the Sea Peoples with ropes attached to grappling hooks thrown into the rigging.

Introduction of the ram

Around the 8th century BC, ramming began to be employed as war galleys were equipped with heavy bronze rams. Records of the Persian Wars in the early 5th century BC by the Ancient historian Herodotus (c. 484–25 BC) show that by this time ramming tactics had evolved among the Greeks. The formations adapted for ramming warfare could either be in columns in line ahead, one ship following the next, or in a line abreast, with the ships side by side, depending on the tactical situation and the surrounding geography. The primary methods for attack was either to break through the enemy formation or to outflank it. Ramming itself was done by smashing into the rear or side of an enemy ship, punching a hole in the planking. This did not actually sink an ancient galley unless it was heavily laden with cargo and stores. With a normal load, it was buoyant enough to float even with a breached hull. Breaking the enemy's oars was another way of rendering ships immobile, rendering them easier targets. If ramming was not possible or successful, the on-board complement of soldiers would attempt to board and capture the enemy vessel by securing it with grappling irons, accompanied by missile fire with arrows or javelins. Trying to set the enemy ship on fire by hurling incendiary missiles or by pouring the content of fire pots attached to long handles is thought to have been used, especially since smoke below decks would easily disable rowers. Rhodes was the first naval power to employ this weapon, sometime in the 3rd century, and used it to fight off head-on attacks or to frighten enemies into exposing their sides for a ramming attack.

A successful ramming was difficult to achieve; just the right amount of speed and precise maneuvering were required. Fleets that did not have well-drilled, experienced oarsmen and skilled commanders relied more on boarding with superior infantry (such as increasing the complement to 40 soldiers). Ramming attempts were countered by keeping the bow toward the enemy until the enemy crew tired, and then attempting to board as quickly as possible. A double-line formation could be used to achieve a breakthrough by engaging the first line and then rushing the rearguard in to take advantage of weak spots in the enemy's defense. This required superiority in numbers, though, since a shorter front risked being flanked or surrounded.

Boarding prevails

Despite the attempts to counter increasingly heavy ships, ramming tactics were gradually superseded in the last centuries BC by the Macedonians and Romans, both primarily land-based powers. Hand-to-hand fighting with large complements of heavy infantry supported by ship-borne catapults dominated the fighting style during the Roman era, a move that was accompanied by the conversion to heavier ships with larger rowing complements and more men per oar. Though effectively lowering mobility, it meant that less skill was required from individual oarsmen. Fleets thereby became less dependent on rowers with a lifetime of experience at the oar.

By late antiquity, in the 1st centuries AD, ramming tactics had completely disappeared along with the knowledge of the design of the ancient trireme. Medieval galleys instead developed a projection, or "spur", in the bow that was designed to break oars and to act as a boarding platform for storming enemy ships. The only remaining examples of ramming tactics were passing references to attempts to collide with ships in order to destabilize or capsize them.

The Byzantine navy, the largest Mediterranean war fleet throughout most of the Early Middle Ages, employed crescent formations with the flagship in the center and the heavier ships at the horns of the formation, in order to turn the enemy's flanks. Similar tactics are believed to have been employed by the Arab fleets they frequently fought from the 7th century onward. The Byzantines were the first to employ Greek fire, a highly effective incendiary liquid, as a naval weapon. It could be fired through a metal tube, or siphon, mounted in the bows, similar to a modern flame thrower. Greek fire was similar to napalm and was a key to several major Byzantine victories. By 835, the weapon had spread to the Arabs, who equipped harraqas, "fireships", with it. The initial stages in naval battles was an exchanges of missiles, ranging from combustible projectiles to arrows, caltrops, and javelins. The aim was not to sink ships, but to deplete the ranks of the enemy crews before the boarding commenced, which decided the outcome. Once the enemy strength was judged to have been reduced sufficiently, the fleets closed in, the ships grappled each other, and the marines and upper bank oarsmen boarded the enemy vessel and engaged in hand-to-hand combat. Byzantine dromons had pavesades, racks along the railings, on which marines could hang their shields, providing protection to the deck crew. Larger ships also had wooden castles on either side between the masts, which allowed archers to shoot from an elevated firing position.

Later medieval navies continued to use similar tactics, with the line abreast formation as standard. As galleys were intended to be fought from the bows, and were at their weakest along the sides, especially in the middle. The crescent formation employed by the Byzantines continued to be used throughout the Middle Ages. It would allow the wings of the fleet to crash their bows straight into the sides of the enemy ships at the edge of the formation.

Roger of Lauria (c. 1245–1305) was a successful medieval naval tactician who fought for the Aragon navy against French Angevin fleets in the War of the Sicilian Vespers. At the Battle of Malta in July 1283, he lured out Angevin galleys that were beached stern-first by openly challenging them. Attacking them in a strong defensive position head-on would have been very dangerous since it offered good cohesion, allowed rowers to escape ashore and made it possible to reinforce weak positions by transferring infantry along the shore. He also employed skilled crossbowmen and almogavars, light infantry, that were more nimbler in ship-to-ship actions than heavily armed and armored French soldiers. At the Battle of the Gulf of Naples in 1284, his forces launched clay cooking pots filled with soap before attacking; when the pots broke against the enemy decks, they became perilously slippery and difficult for heavy infantry to keep their feet on.

Gun galleys
The earliest guns were of large calibers, and were initially of wrought iron, which made them weak compared to cast bronze guns that would become standard in the 16th century. They were at first fixed directly on timbers in the bow, aiming directly forward. This placement would remain largely unchanged until the galley disappeared from active service in the 19th century. The introduction of heavy guns and small arms did not change tactics considerably. If anything, it accentuated the bow as the offensive weapon, being both a staging area for boarders and the given position for small arms and cannons. The galley was capable of outperforming sailing vessel in early battles. It retained a distinct tactical advantage even after the initial introduction of naval artillery because of the ease with which it could be brought to bear upon an opposing vessel.

In large-scale galley-to-galley engagements, tactics remained essentially the same until the end of the 16th century. Cannons and small firearms were introduced around the 14th century, but did not have immediate effects on tactics; the same basic crescent formation in line abreast that was employed at the Battle of Lepanto in 1571 was used by the Byzantine fleet almost a millennium earlier. Artillery on early gun galleys was not used as a long-range standoff weapon against other gun-armed ships. The maximum distance at which contemporary cannons were effective, c. 500 m (1600 ft), could be covered by a galley in about two minutes, much faster than the reload time of any heavy artillery. Gun crews would therefore hold their fire until the last possible moment, somewhat similar to infantry tactics in the pre-industrial era of short range firearms. The weak points of a galley remained the sides and especially the rear, the command center. Unless one side managed to outmaneuver the other, battle would be met with ships crashing into each other head on. Once fighting began with ships locking on to one another bow to bow, the fighting would be fought over the front line ships. Unless a galley was completely overrun by an enemy boarding party, fresh troops could be fed into the fight from reserve vessels in the rear.

Ceremonial symbolism

Galleys were used for purely ceremonial purposes by many rulers and states. In early modern Europe, galleys enjoyed a level of prestige that sailing vessels did not enjoy. Galleys had from an early stage been commanded by the leaders of land forces, and fought with tactics adapted from land warfare. As such, they enjoyed the prestige associated with land battles, the ultimate achievement of a high-standing noble or king. In the Baltic, the Swedish king Gustav I, the founder of the modern Swedish state, showed particular interest in galleys, as was befitting a Renaissance prince. Whenever traveling by sea, Gustav, the court, royal bureaucrats, and the royal bodyguard would travel by galley. Around the same time, English king Henry VIII had high ambitions to live up to the reputation of the omnipotent Renaissance ruler and also had a few Mediterranean-style galleys built (and even manned them with slaves), though the English navy relied mostly on sailing ships at the time.

Despite the rising importance of sailing warships, galleys were more closely associated with land warfare, and the prestige associated with it. British naval historian Nicholas Rodger has described this as display of "the supreme symbol of royal power ... derived from its intimate association with armies, and consequently with princes". This was put to perhaps its greatest effect by the French "Sun King", Louis XIV, in the form of a dedicated galley corps. Louis and the French state created a tool and symbol of royal authority that did little fighting, but was a potent extension of absolutist ambitions. Galleys were built to scale for the royal flotilla at the Grand Canal at the Gardens of Versailles for the amusement of the court. The royal galleys patrolled the Mediterranean, forcing ships of other states to salute the King's banner, convoyed ambassadors and cardinals, and obediently participating in naval parades and royal pageantry. Historian Paul Bamford described the galleys as vessels that "must have appealed to military men and to aristocratic officers ... accustomed to being obeyed and served".

Sentencing criminals, political dissenters and religious deviants as galley rowers also turned the galley corps into a large, feared, and cost-effective prison system. French Protestants were particularly ill-treated at the oar and though they were only a small minority, their experiences came to dominate the legacy of the king's galleys. In 1909, French author Albert Savine (1859–1927) wrote that "[a]fter the Bastille, the galleys were the greatest horror of the old regime". Long after convicts stopped serving in the galleys, and even after the reign of Napoleon, the term galérien ("galley rower") remained a symbolic general term for forced labor and convicts serving harsh sentences.

Being a galley rower did not carry such stigma at Baltic, where galley rowers were conscripts: rather they considered themselves as marine soldiers. The main building of the Finnish Naval Academy at Suomenlinna, Helsinki bears the nickname Kivikaleeri ("Stone Galley") as a legacy of the era.

Surviving examples

Original vessels
 The Istanbul Naval Museum contains the galley Tarihi Kadırga (Turkish for "historical galley", ultimately from Byzantine Greek katergon). The galley was used in the period of the sultan Mehmed IV (1648–1687), but researches indicate that it (or some parts?) may have been built at the end of the 16th century. She was the personal galley of the sultan, and remained in service until 1839. She is presumably the only surviving galley in the world, albeit without its masts. It is 37 m long, 5.7 m wide, has a draught of about 2 m, weighs about 140 tons, and has 48 oars powered by 144 oarsmen.

Reconstructions
 A 1971 reconstruction of the Real, the flagship of John of Austria in the Battle of Lepanto (1571), is in the Museu Marítim in Barcelona. The ship was 60 m long and 6.2 m wide, had a draught of 2.1 m, weighing 239 tons empty, was propelled by 290 rowers, and carried about 400 crew and fighting soldiers at Lepanto. She was substantially larger than the typical galleys of her time.
 The Galata - Museo del mare in Genoa has a 40-meter-long full-scale reconstruction of a 17th-century Genoese galley.
 A group called "The Trireme Trust" operates, in conjunction with the Greek Navy, a reconstruction of an ancient Greek Trireme, the Olympias.
 Ivlia is a replica Greek bireme built at Sochi on the Black Sea in 1989 which spent six seasons touring round Europe with volunteer crews.
 The Nomos, another trireme originally built for Clash of the Titans, is preserved at the Charlestown Shipwreck & Heritage Centre in Charlestown, Cornwall.

Archaeological finds
 In 1965, the remains of a small Venetian galley (fusta) sunk in 1509 were found in Lake Garda, Italy. The vessel had been burned and only the lower hull remained.
 In the mid-1990s, a sunken medieval galley was found close to the island of San Marco in Boccalama, in the Venice Lagoon. The hull has been dated, from the context and the C-14 analysis, between the late 13th and early 14th century. The excavation and the photogrammetric survey (photogrammetry) and 3D laser scanner of this important testimony of medieval nautical archaeology has started in 2001 through two complex executive phases. The stratigraphic excavation of the wreck was in fact performed entirely underwater, according to the archaeological methodologies. The survey of the hull was instead realized after the setting in dry the entire medieval perimeter of the submerged island. This operation took place through the infixation of a continuous barrier consisting of sheet piles and the use of water pumps. This long excavation and documentation campaign was directed by underwater archaeologist Marco D'Agostino and, as deputy director, by his colleague Stefano Medas. The lower hull is mostly intact. It was not recovered due to high costs.

See also
 Borobudur ship
 Garay
 Lancaran
 Penjajap
 Kelulus
 Xebec
 Mong Dong

Notes

References
 Anderson, Roger Charles, Oared fighting ships: From classical times to the coming of steam. London. 1962.
 Bamford, Paul W., Fighting ships and prisons: the Mediterranean Galleys of France in the Age of Louis XIV. Cambridge University Press, London. 1974. 
 Basch, L. & Frost, H. "Another Punic wreck off Sicily: its ram" in International journal of Nautical Archaeology vol 4.2, 1975. pp. 201–228
 Bass, George F. (editor), A History of Seafaring, Thames & Hudson, 1972
 Gardiner, Robert & Lavery, Brian (editors), The Line of Battle: Sailing Warships 1650–1840. Conway Maritime Press, London. 1992. 
 Casson, Lionel, "Galley Slaves" in Transactions and Proceedings of the American Philological Association, Vol. 97 (1966), pp. 35–44
 Casson, Lionel, Ships and Seamanship in the Ancient World, Princeton University Press, 1971
 Casson, Lionel, The Ancient Mariners: Seafarers and Sea Fighters of the Mediterranean in Ancient Times Princeton University Press, Princeton, NJ. 1991. 
 D'Agostino, Marco & Medas, Stefano, Excavation and Recording of the medieval Hulls at San Marco in Boccalama (Venice), the INA Quarterly (Institute of Nautical Archaeology), 30, 1, Spring 2003, pp. 22–28
 Glete, Jan, Navies and nations: Warships, navies, and state building in Europe and America, 1500–1860. Almqvist & Wiksell International, Stockholm. 1993. 
 Glete, Jan, Warfare at Sea, 1500–1650: Maritime Conflicts and the Transformation of Europe. Routledge, London. 2000. 
 Guilmartin, John Francis, Gunpowder and Galleys: Changing Technology and Mediterranean Warfare at Sea in the Sixteenth Century. Cambridge University Press, London. 1974. 
 Hattendorf, John B. & Unger, Richard W. (editors), War at Sea in the Middle Ages and the Renaissance. Woodbridge, Suffolk. 2003.  War at Sea in the Middle Ages and the Renaissance
 Knighton, C.S. and Loades, David M., The Anthony Roll of Henry VIII's Navy: Pepys Library 2991 and British Library Additional MS 22047 with related documents. Ashgate Publishing, Aldershot. 2000. 
 Lehmann, L. Th., Galleys in the Netherlands. Meulenhoff, Amsterdam. 1984. 
 Morrison, John S. & Gardiner, Robert (editors), The Age of the Galley: Mediterranean Oared Vessels Since Pre-Classical Times. Conway Maritime, London, 1995. 
 Mallett, Michael E. (1967) The Florentine Galleys in the Fifteenth Century with the Diary of Luca di Maso degli Albizzi, Captain of the Galleys 1429–1430. Clarendon Press, Oxford. 1967
 Mooney, James L. (editor), Dictionary of American Naval Fighting Ships: Volume 4. Naval Historical Center, Washington. 1969.
 Morrison, John S., Coates, John F. & Rankov, Boris,The Athenian Trireme: the History and Reconstruction of An Ancient Greek Warship. Cambridge University Press, Cambridge. 2000. 
 Murray, William (2012)  The Age of Titans: The Rise and Fall of the Great Hellenistic Navies. Oxford University Press, Oxford. 
 Norman, Hans (editor), Skärgårdsflottan: uppbyggnad, militär användning och förankring i det svenska samhället 1700–1824. Historiska media, Lund. 2000.  
 Pryor, John H., "The naval battles of Roger of Lauria" in Journal of Medieval History 9. Amsterdam. 1983; pp. 179–216
 Pryor, John H., Geography, technology and war: Studies in the maritime history of the Mediterranean 649–1571. Cambridge University Press, Cambridge. 1992.  Geography, Technology, and War: Studies in the Maritime History of the Mediterranean, 649-1571
 Reid, Anthony (editor), Southeast Asia in the Early Modern Era: Trade, Power, and Belief. Cornell University Press, Ithaca, NY 1993. 
 Rodger, Nicholas A.M., "The Development of Broadside Gunnery, 1450–1650." Mariner's Mirror 82 (1996), pp. 301–324.
 Rodger, Nicholas A.M., The Safeguard of the Sea: A Naval History of Britain 660–1649. W.W. Norton & Company, New York. 1997. 
 Rose, Susan, Medieval Naval Warfare, 1000–1500.Routledge. London. 2002. 
 Rodgers, William Ledyard, Naval Warfare Under Oars: 4th to 16th Centuries, Naval Institute Press, 1940.
 Unger, Richard W. The Ship in Medieval Economy 600–1600 Croom Helm, London. 1980. 
 Wade, Geoff & Li, Tana Anthony Reid and the Study of the Southeast Asian Past. Institute of Southeast Asian Studies, Singapore. 2012 
 Winfield, Rif (2009) British Warships in the Age of Sail, 1603–1714: Design, Construction, Careers and Fates. Seaforth, Barnsley.

External links

 
 John F. Guilmartin, "The Tactics of the Battle of Lepanto Clarified: The Impact of Social, Economic, and Political Factors on Sixteenth Century Galley Warfare". A very detailed discussion of galley warfare at the Battle of Lepanto
 Rafael Rebolo Gómez – "The Carthaginian navy"., 2005, Treballs del Museu Arqueologic d'Eivissa e Formentera. 
 "Some Engineering Concepts applied to Ancient Greek Trireme Warships", John Coates, University of Oxford, The 18th Jenkin Lecture, 1 October 2005.

Ancient ships
 
Human-powered watercraft
Ship types
Deforestation in Turkey